The Cheteria are a group of royal dignitaries within the Sultanate of Brunei whose position ranks below the Royal Wazir but above the Manteri. Each carry specialized tasks and report directly to the Sultan of Brunei. The Cheteria hierarchy is structured around what is known as the Four Fold system which expands up to 32 folds. The title of Cheteria are only bestowed upon the Pengiran, especially to the caste of Pengiran known as the Pengiran Peranakan. The awarding of such titles are held in a ceremony called "mengangkat".

Hierarchy 
There are several levels within the Cheteria group:

 Chief Cheteria
 Cheteria 4
 Additional Cheteria Under Cheteria 4
 Cheteria 8 
 Cheteria 16
 Additional Cheteria Under Cheteria 16
 Cheteria 32

The Chief Cheteria maintains the highest rank of the Cheteria. In general, however, the number of positions within each Cheteria level follows the number of the level e.g.; the Cheteria 8 would consist of 8 positions and Cheteria 32 of 32 positions. An exception to this would be the Chief Cheteria of which there are two ranks (Head and Vice Head) and the additional Cheteria to Cheteria 4 and 16 of which; there is one additional Cheteria under Cheteria 4 and two additional Cheteria under Cheteria 16.

Title and Styling 

Every individual who is bestowed with the position of Cheteria are given a unique title and referred to with the honorific style "Yang Amat Mulia" which roughly translates to "The Most Noble" or "His Highness". For example; for someone who is awarded the title of "Pengiran Kesuma Negara" which is a position in the Cheteria 8, would be fully styled as "Yang Amat Mulia Pengiran Kesuma Negara", followed by another title (if any) and then real name.

Notes 

 Mohd. Jamil Al-Sufri (2002). Adat Istiadat Diraja Brunei. Bandar Seri Begawan: Jabatan Adat Istiadat Negara.

External links 

 Senarai Wazir dan Cheteria di laman BRUNEIresources.com

References 

Politics of Brunei